William Andrew Pertica (August 17, 1898 – December 28, 1967) was a pitcher in Major League Baseball who played from  through  for the Boston Red Sox (1918) and St. Louis Cardinals (1921–1923). He was born in Santa Barbara, California.

In a four season-career, Pertica posted a 22–18 record with a 4.27 ERA in 74 appearances, including 46 starts, 17 complete games, two shutouts, two saves, 98 strikeouts, 138 walks, and 331.0 innings of work.

Pertica died at the age of 69 in Los Angeles, California.

Best season
1921 - Posted career-highs in wins (14), SO (67), ERA (3.37), and innings pitched.

Fact
Was a member of the 1918 American League champions Red Sox, although he did not play in the World Series.

External links

Retrosheet

Boston Red Sox players
St. Louis Cardinals players
Major League Baseball pitchers
Baseball players from California
Sportspeople from Santa Barbara, California
Burials at Willamette National Cemetery
1898 births
1967 deaths